Svartöstaden is a residential area in Luleå, Sweden. It had 783 inhabitants in 2010.

References

External links
Svartöstaden at Luleå Municipality

Luleå